Clostridium scatologenes (CLOSL) is an anaerobic, motile, gram-positive bacterium.

Originally, in 1925, Fellers and Clough named this species Clostridium scatol. In 1927, Weinberg and Ginsbourg's later reclassification was Bacillus scatologenes. The species has borne its present name since 1948.

References

External links
 
 Type strain of Clostridium scatologenes at BacDive -  the Bacterial Diversity Metadatabase

Gram-positive bacteria
Bacteria described in 1948
scatologenes